The Santa Ynez Stakes is a Grade II American thoroughbred horse race for three-year-old fillies over a distance of seven furlongs on the dirt track held annually in early January at Santa Anita Park in Arcadia, California, USA.  The event currently offers a purse of US$200,000.

History

The event was named after the location and landmarks in Southern California, known as Santa Ynez in the Santa Ynez Valley and the Santa Ynez Mountains in Santa Barbara County. Santa Ynez is Spanish for the virgin martyr Saint Agnes.

The inaugural running of the event was on New Year's Day in 1952 over a distance of six furlongs and was won the C. Ralph West trained coupled entry of Last Greetings and Asiatic. Last Greetings was ridden by US Hall of Fame jockey Eddie Arcaro won by  lengths over A Gleam with long shot Season's Best was three lengths further back in third. While Last Greetings won one more event in her career, A Gleam had a phenomenal season setting a Hollywood Park Racetrack record winning five straight stakes races in 1952.

For the 1952–53 Winter Meeting at Santa Anita the event was held as a two-year-old fillies event on the last day of December in 1952. Hence the event was not held in the 1953 calendar year. In 1954 the distance of the event was extended to 7 furlongs. In 1956 the distance of the event was reverted to six furlongs. The last running of the event at the six furlongs distance was in 1957 and was won by the 2/5 short priced favorite Sully's Trial who completed a six race winning streak. 

In 1958 the distance was increased to  furlongs and was run at this distance for nine years. Of the notable winners during this period include the 1959 winner Silver Spoon who would be the first filly to win the Santa Ynez–Santa Susana Stakes (now Santa Anita Oaks) double as well as the Santa Anita Derby and run fifth in the 1959 Kentucky Derby to winner Tomy Lee. Silver Spoon would be voted as Thoroughbred Racing Association's U.S. Champion Three-Year-Old Filly. The 1964 winner Face The Facts, even money favorite, won by a stakes record  lengths and equaled the track record for the  furlongs distance.  The winning margin continues to be the stakes record  margin to date. In 1967 the event's distance was increased to seven furlongs and was run at this distance until 2012. 

In the early 1970s three winners of the event went on the win the Santa Ynez–Santa Susana Stakes double. The 1971 winner Turkish Trousers easily won the event by  lengths in a time of 1:23. She later would be voted U.S. Champion Three-Year-Old Filly for 1971.  In 1972 Fred W. Hooper's Susan's Girl set a new stakes record of 1:21 in her easy  length victory. She also would go on and have a successful year winning the Kentucky Oaks as well as seven other stakes races around the US and would be crowned U.S. Champion Three-Year-Old Filly.
 
In 1973 when the American Graded Stakes Committee would actively begin classifying events the Santa Ynez Stakes was classified as a Grade II event. However, the event would be downgraded to Grade III in 1975. In 1981 the event was upgraded once more to Grade II for three runnings.

The event was run in two divisions in 1984. Also in 1984 the event was downgraded again to Grade III. The event nonetheless attracted high quality fillies who were starting their campaigns for the year and would go on to have outstanding seasons. The 1987 winner Very Subtle won her sixth straight race and later in the year would win the Breeders' Cup Sprint. The 1988 winner Goodbye Halo was a short 4/5 odds-on favorite and easily account for her opposition winning by five lengths. Later in the spring of that year she captured the Grade I Kentucky Oaks. With such quality fillies winning the race the event was reclassified as Grade II in 1990. Between 1990 and 1995, the Breeders' Cup sponsored the event which reflected in the name of the event.

In 1995 the event was once again was classified as Grade III and the winner was Robert & Beverly Lewis's Serena's Song, winning by two lengths as the 3/2 second favorite. Serena's Song would win eight more races, six of which were Grade I, including defeating her male counterparts in the GI Haskell Invitational Handicap. Her performance earned her U.S. Champion Three-Year-Old Filly honors for 1995.

Since 1999 the event has been classified with Grade II status.

In the 21st century the event has continued to be a major preparatory race for three-year-old fillies who go on and excel in higher classified with greater stakes. Lightly raced Golden Ballet won the event in 2001 and captured the Santa Ynez–Santa Anita Oaks double. 

In 2007 Santa Anita Park administration installed a new All-weather track and for the 2008 the winner was the 2007 Breeders' Cup Juvenile Fillies and 2007 US Champion Two-Year-Old Filly Indian Blessing. Indian Blessing started as the 1/10 odds-on favorite, although she was 3 lengths ahead in the straight Indian Blessing  held on for a head victory over Golden Doc setting a new stakes and track record for the distance of 1:19.89.

Since 2011 the event has been held on the dirt track.

In 2018 Midnight Bisou as a maiden having her third start won the event convincingly by  lengths. Although Midnight Bisou did not win any honors the following year she won seven graded events and was crowned US Champion Older Dirt Female Horse for 2019.

Since 2013 the event is part of the Road to the Kentucky Oaks.

Records

Speed record: 
7 furlongs: 1:19.89 – Indian Blessing (2008)
 furlongs: 1:15.25 – Reneesgotzip (2012)
 6 furlongs: 1:10.20 – Sully's Trail (1957)

Margins:
 lengths – Face The Facts (1964) 

Most wins by a jockey:
 7 – Bill Shoemaker (1960, 1961, 1962, 1969, 1971, 1980, 1987)

Most wins by a trainer:
 7 – Bob Baffert (1997, 2004, 2008, 2014, 2020, 2021, 2022)

Most wins by an owner:
 3 – Bernard J. Ridder and/or Ridder Thoroughbred Stable (1974, 1981, 1996)

Santa Ynez Stakes – Santa Susana Stakes/Santa Anita Oaks double:
 Silver Spoon (1959), Spearfish (1966), Mira Femme (1967), Allie's Serenade (1968), Opening Bid (1970), Turkish Trousers (1971), Susan's Girl (1972), Grenzen (1978), Serena's Song (1995), Golden Ballet (2001), Midnight Bisou (2018), Bellafina (2019)

Winners

Legend:

 
 

Notes:

§ Ran as an entry

† Event held as a two-year-old fillies event since the scheduling of the event was in December for the 1952–53 Winter Meeting at Santa Anita

See also
Road to the Kentucky Oaks
List of American and Canadian Graded races

External links
 2021 Santa Anita Media Guide

References

Horse races in California
Santa Anita Park
Flat horse races for three-year-old fillies
Graded stakes races in the United States
Grade 2 stakes races in the United States
Horse races established in 1952
Recurring sporting events established in 1952
1952 establishments in California